The Missisa River is a river in northeastern Kenora District in northwestern Ontario, Canada. It is in the James Bay drainage basin and is a right tributary of the Attawapiskat River.

The Missisa River begins at Missisa Lake and flows north to its mouth at the Attawapiskat River, which flows to James Bay.

References

Sources

"Missisa River" at Atlas of Canada. Accessed 2016-05-03.

Rivers of Kenora District